Maxim Novoselov (born 15 May 1973, in Chelyabinsk) is a Russian sambist and mixed martial arts fighter, and a European champion in combat sambo and mixed martials arts.

Biography 
For several months he served in Nagorno-Karabakh as a military instructor. After returning, he began to participate in underground fights without rules. In the early 1990s, he participated in criminal showdowns. In 1993, he was sentenced to 14 years in prison on charges of murder. Despite this, he still continued to participate in underground battles.

A week after the release, he already participated in the battles. In Japan, he was given the nickname 'Mad Max'. In 2012, he was sentenced to three and a half years for patronizing the drug business.

During his imprisonment, he managed to convince the leadership of the colony of the need to create conditions for sports. The convicts adapted two rooms for training and equipped them with home-made simulators. Under the leadership of Novoselov, 40 prisoners trained.

Mikhail Koklyaev made a report about his section 'Real rocking chair'. The issue about Novoselov's section was watched by several million people.

He has fought 14 fights on a professional level. At the beginning of his career in mixed martial arts, he won only one fight in his first tour, but later, after a long absence (he had only won one fight between 2008 and 2016), he won 10 fights in a row, finishing all of them in the first round. For almost all rivals, the fight with Novoselov was the debut in professional MMA, and for many the only one, with the exception of Jimmy Ambris.

On 29 June 2019, Novoselov was supposed to fight with Vyacheslav Datsik. However, on June 16, Datsik's jaw broke in the True Gym Fights tournament and the fights had to be cancelled.

Battle statistics

References 

1973 births
Living people
Russian male mixed martial artists
Mixed martial artists utilizing sambo
Russian sambo practitioners
Russian murderers
Sportspeople from Chelyabinsk